EP Petroecuador (Empresa Estatal Petróleos del Ecuador; Empresa Pública Petroecuador; meaning: State Petroleum Company of Ecuador) is the national oil company of Ecuador. Ecuador who is a member of the Organization of the Petroleum Exporting Countries (OPEC) and, although it is the smallest member, the country produced 531,000 barrels of crude oil per day in 2019. The oil corporation is a significant part of the Ecuadorian economy. The petroleum industry has expanded to the production of refined commodities such as gasoline, liquefied petroleum, and jet fuel. The government of Ecuador is highly dependent on the revenues from the energy sector to support its budget and finance state projects.

History
Petroecuador is a state-owned enterprise, founded on September 26, 1989. In its conception, Petroecuador began as a fiscal agent; however, in time, it came to manage and operate most of the country's oil sector. It is the successor to Corporación Estatal Petrolera Ecuatoriana (CEPE) which was formed in 1972. In 1973 Ecuador granted Shell Oil drilling concessions. In 1964, Texaco was also invited. From 1977, Texaco became the majority owner (62.5%) until it transferred ownership back to the Ecuadorean state in 1992, maintaining a 37.5% ownership. The transfer of ownership was due to political policies within Ecuador limiting foreign ownership as well as the decision not to re-new the contracts.

Operations
Petroecuador is engaged in the exploration, production, storage, refining of crude oil, and retailing petroleum products. It operates through subsidiaries, such as Petroproduccion (exploration and production), Petroindustrial (refining), and Petrocomercial (transportation and marketing of refined products). The company operates several oil fields, including Shushufindi, Sacha, Auca, Lago Agrio, and Libertador. It also operates the Trans-Ecuadorian oil pipeline network, Sistema de Oleoducto Transecuatoriano (SOTE), built in 1972 for Texaco-Gulf. Ecuador is the fifth largest oil producer in the Latin American region.

Petroecuador owns three petroleum refineries in Ecuador:
 Esmeraldas Refinery,  (began 1978)
 La Libertad Refinery, 
 Shushufindi Refinery, 

The Sector organization in 2012 was organized into the National Oil Companies (NOC's), Petroecuador, Petroamazonas and the Operaciones Rio Napo (which is jointly owned between Ecuador and Venezuela).
The company's marketing network includes 148 Petrocomercial service stations.

The largest production of oil in Ecuador is concentrated in the Northeastern part of the province. The Ishpingo-Tambococha-Tiputini (ITT) in the Yasuni National Park is said to hold 909 million barrels of oil reserves, yet controversial social relations causes protests and political conflicts. The indigenous social relations regarding the oil production of Ecuador are facing controversial issues. The indigenous communities have suffered various consequences for the growing energy sector in Ecuador as it seeks to expand. The state policies have caused domestic conflicts among local communities were the indigenous territories and practices are overlooked in expense to the state economic benefits. In 2003 and in 2010, the protest escalated due to political campaigns urging privatization ( 2003) and expansionist policies enabling foreign corporations access to the market ( 2010)

The company owns and operates an Embraer ERJ 145LR aircraft (as of August 2016).

Safety record

On February 26, 1998 there was an explosion and fire at the Petroecuador pipeline in Esmeraldas, a port city in northwest Ecuador.

Petroecuador has also contributed to certain human rights violations according to some critics. The violations are on the health basis concerning the local populations due to bad practice of Petroecuador as well as foreign industries established within Ecuador.

Environmental record

Petroecuador has been the subject of controversy over the impact of exploration and pipeline operations on the environment and Huaorani and Cofan indigenous peoples within the Amazon basin in Ecuador's Oriente (eastern) region. In 1964 oil drilling operations began to take place in previously roadless rainforest carried out by Texaco.

Advocacy groups such as Amazon Watch and ChevronToxico have attempted to document the oil spills, ecological damage and human impacts of these operations. Prof. Judith Kimerling of CUNY School of Law in 1991 published a book Amazon Crude which details many of these problems.

Petroecuador has been the sole owner and operator of the oil facilities since 1990.  In 2000–2008, the company was responsible for 1,415 oil spills.  Petroecuador has also failed to clean up sites that were its responsibility under the joint venture.

Lago Agrio oil field operations

Between the years 1964 and 1992 the Texaco Corporation and years later Petroecuador carried on intensive oil operations in the northeastern region of the Ecuadorian Amazon. These operations affected indigenous and non-indigenous local livelihoods in the area by impairing the ecological functions and biodiversity of thousands of acres of land. Today the effects of these operations have been investigated and through the dumping crude in open pits, burying oil extraction byproducts, and burning unwanted oil without proper treatment, cancer rates amongst indigenous and non-indigenous residence has increased dramatically with in a ten-year time period. As oil weathers, contamination occurs as aromatic compounds are released and invade surrounding aquifers.

See also

 Sarayaku

References

 International Directory of Company Histories, Vol. 4. St. James Press, 1991,Petroleos del Ecuador History, FundingUniversity.
 U.S. Energy Information Administration( eia), Jan 2014, Ecuador Countries overview
 Sawyer, Suzanna. Crude Chronicles: Indigenous Politics, Multinational Oil, and Neoliberalism in Ecuador.Durham; Duke University Press, 2004.
 Center for Economic and Social Rights, Health and Human Rights Vol 01, No01, (1994) Published by The President and fellows of Harvard College.

External links
 
 Ecuador Crude Oil Production

Oil and gas companies of Ecuador
Ec
Non-renewable resource companies established in 1972
Ecuadorian brands
Energy companies established in 1972
1972 establishments in Ecuador